Lazio is a region of Italy in which Rome is located.

Lazio may also refer to:

 Eccellenza Lazio, the regional football league
 S.S. Lazio, a football club based in Rome
 Giro del Lazio, a bicycle race
 Rick Lazio, a U.S. Representative from the state of New York
 Anse Lazio, a beach on Praslin Island, Seychelles
 20513 Lazio, an asteroid
 Viale Lazio massacre, a historical incident of Palermo, Sicily
 , an Italian cargo ship in service 1953-79
 MV Lazio (1993), in service since 1994

See also
 Latium, the ancient name for Lazio